Raymond Theodore Robinson (October 29, 1910 – June 11, 1985) was a disfigured American man whose years of nighttime walks made him into a figure of urban legend in western Pennsylvania. Robinson was so severely injured in a childhood electrical accident that he could not go out in public without fear of causing a panic, so he went for long walks at night. Local tourists would drive along his road in hopes of meeting the Green Man or Charlie No-Face; they became disappointed to see no such person. However, they passed on tales about him to their children and grandchildren regardless, and people raised on these tales are sometimes surprised to discover that he was a real person who was liked by his family and neighbors.

Injury
Raymond Robinson was eight years old when he was injured by an electrical line as he climbed a pole and reached for a bird's nest on the Morado Bridge, outside of Beaver Falls. The bridge carried a trolley and had electrical lines of both 1,200 and 22,000 Volts, which were responsible for the death of another boy less than a year earlier. Robinson survived, defying doctors' expectations, but he was severely disfigured: he lost his eyes, nose, and right arm.

Adult life
Robinson lived in Koppel, Beaver County, Pennsylvania and spent his days at home with relatives, making doormats, wallets, and belts to sell. Because of his appearance, he rarely ventured out during the day. However, at night, he went for long walks on a quiet stretch of State Route 351, feeling his way along with a walking stick. Groups of locals regularly gathered to search for him walking along the road. Robinson usually hid from his curious neighbors, but would sometimes exchange a short conversation or a photograph for beer or cigarettes. Some were friendly, others cruel, but none of his encounters deterred Robinson from his nightly walks. He was struck by cars more than once. He stopped his walks during the last years of his life, and retired to the Beaver County Geriatric Center, where he died in 1985 at the age of 74.

Legacy
Robinson became a local myth in the Pittsburgh area, and his real story was obscured by urban legend. In the stories, he is the "Green Man", and as a boy, he climbed an electric pole to see into a bird's nest, and was shocked. He fell to the ground, and lost his eyes, nose, mouth, one ear, and one arm. The story states that when he grew older, he hid in an abandoned house. The famed nickname of "Green Man" came from his skin, which was purported to be green because of the electrical shock he suffered in the stories.  Through several generations, Robinson's story has been passed on so many times that his name and his real history have been overshadowed by the ghost story that grew out of them.

Filmmaker Tisha York planned to direct and publish a film based on the Green Man urban legend, titled Route 351, in 2008, intending to complete it in 2009. Shooting was delayed by the Great Recession and is on hold . York holds the film rights to the story.

References

1910 births
1985 deaths
American amputees
American ghosts
People from Beaver Falls, Pennsylvania
Urban legends
American blind people